Pirwa (Aymara and Quechua for granary, deposit, Hispanicized spelling Pirhua) is a mountain in the Andes of Peru, about  high. It is located in the Arequipa Region, Caylloma Province, Tisco District. It lies northwest of Jañuma Pirwa.

Two intermittent streams named Nañuma ("slim water") and Wiluma ("red water") originate south of the mountain. They flow to the Pirwamayu in the south. The Pirwamayu (Quechua for "granary river") is a right affluent of the Qullqa River.

References

Mountains of Peru
Mountains of Arequipa Region